Great Cornish Families: A History of the People and Their Houses is a book by Crispin Gill, published in 1995. A second edition was published in 2011. Crispin Gill, at the time of the book's publication, lived in Plymouth and was assistant editor of the Western Morning News. The book names many notable families that have featured prominently in Cornwall's history.

Gill's great families
Gill chooses the following families:

The great Arundells of Lanherne, Arundells of Trerice
Bassets of Tehidy
Merchant princes, the Bolithos
Boscawens, the Earls of Falmouth, Cornwall
Carew Poles of Anthony
Edgcumbes of Mount Edgcumbe House
The Eliots, Earls of St Germans
Godolphins of Godolphin
The Gallant Grenvilles
The Piratical Killigrews, the Theatrical Killigrews
Molesworth St Aubyns of Pencarrow
Prideauxs of Padstow
Rashleighs of Menabilly, The Rashleigh baronets
Agar-Robarteses of Lanhydrock
St Aubyns of St Michael's Mount
Treffrys of Fowey
Shall Trelawny die?
The romantic Trevanions
Vivians of Glynn
Vyvyans of Trelowarren
The Mining Williamses
The Penroses of Killiow

Additional families

Gill's list of important families not included above
In the introduction to Great families . . . , the following additional potentially great families are mentioned. They were not included in the list as they were deemed by him to have failed to "found a dynasty":

Buller family of Morval, Cornwall, later of Downes in Devon, founders of a great dynasty.
Carminow family
Coryton family of Pentillie
Fortescue family of Boconnoc
Harvey family of Hayle
Hawkins family of Trewithen
Kendall of Pelyn

 Sir. John Fauell, Baron (1245-1291) - Elizabeth Fauell	Elizabeth Fauell
Female (1275- ) - Roger Favel
Lemon family of Carclew
Roscarrock family of St Endellion
Smith-Dorrien-Smith family of Tresco
Tangye family
 Tregoning family of Landue, Lezant 
Tremayne family of Heligan
Trevelyan family

Other
Trefusis of Trefusis Manor, Flushing, near Falmouth, see Baron Clinton

Deacon's list of important families
Bernard Deacon in his History of Cornwall (2007)  suggests the following family names ("merchant bourgeois" who joined the "gentry" from the latter part of the 18th century): Williams, Bolitho, Fox, Davey of Redruth, Daniell of Truro, Harvey of Gwennap, Foster of Lostwithiel.

Landowners
Table of Principal Cornish Landowners, mid-nineteenth century (ranked)

Lord Falmouth
Lord Robartes
G. M. Fortescue
G. L. Basset
Earl of Mount Edgcumbe
C. H. T. Hawkins
Sir R. R. Vyvyan
Col. A. Tremayne
Augustus Coryton

F. Rodd
J. M. Williams
J. J. Rogers
Earl of St Germans
Revd A. Molesworth-St Aubyn
Sir J. Trelawney
C. P. Brune
Edward Coode
Col. S. M. Grylls

Source: Returns of owners of land in England & Wales – House of Commons Sessional papers 1872-3: paper No. 1874 lixxii, quoted in Edwin Jaggard Cornwall politics in the age of reform 1790–1855, (1999).

*(Source: Who owns Britain ? by Kevin Cahill) (Based on Return of Owners of Land, 1873)

See also

Lord Lieutenant of Cornwall
High Sheriff of Cornwall
Landed gentry
Parliamentary representation from Cornwall
:Category:Cornish politicians
Cornish heraldry

References

History of Cornwall
British biographical dictionaries
Cornish families